The Critics' Awards for Theatre in Scotland (CATS) are an annual event awarding performances "substantially produced in Scotland, or developed, rehearsed and premiered in Scotland".

Awards ceremony
The ceremony is itinerant in terms of location, switching between theatre venues across Scotland – for example, in 2007 the ceremony was hosted by Pitlochry Festival Theatre, while in 2019 the event was held at Tramway (arts centre) in Glasgow. Other venues have included Perth Theatre and Edinburgh Festival Theatre.

The Awards Ceremony, which normally takes place on the second Sunday in June, is open to the general public, not just members of Scotland's theatre industry.

Awards covering the 2019-20 theatre season, which was curtailed by the COVID-19 pandemic in Scotland, were belatedly announced in November 2020.

Judges
The judges are invited critics who write regularly on theatre across Scotland, for print and/or online publications.

Award categories

The first CATS, in June 2003 (covering productions between May 2002 to April 2003) announced five awards: Best Production; Best Male Performance; Best Female Performance; Best Design; and Best New Play.

Five additional categories were subsequently added: Best Director; Best Technical Presentation; Best Production for Children and Young People; Best Ensemble; and Best Music and Sound.

The "CATS Whiskers" are awarded – only occasionally – to individuals or organisations whom the judges believe have made a significant  contribution to theatre in Scotland. The most recent recipient was Muriel Romanes in 2016, for "supporting and strengthening women's role in Scottish theatre", most notably as the first artistic director of Stellar Quines Theatre Company.

Previous CATS winners include actors David Tennant and Blythe Duff, productions of Blackbird (play) and Black Watch (play), and theatre companies including Catherine Wheels Theatre Company and the National Theatre of Scotland.

Awards for 2019-2020
The 18th CATS (for 2019-2020) were announced through a press release embargoed until 00:01 on Thursday 12 November 2020. The traditional public awards ceremony had been cancelled due to ongoing COVID-19 restrictions.

Best New Play: Peter Arnott, The Signalman, A Play, A Pie & A Pint in association with Traverse Theatre.

Best Production: The Signalman, A Play, A Pie & A Pint in association with Traverse Theatre.

Best Female Performance: Anna Russell-Martin (Anais Hendricks), The Panopticon, National Theatre of Scotland

Best Male Performance: Tom McGovern (Thomas Barclay), The Signalman, A Play, A Pie & A Pint in association with Traverse Theatre.

Best Ensemble: Thank You Very Much, Manchester International Festival & National Theatre of Scotland.

Best Director: Elizabeth Newman, Faith Healer, Pitlochry Festival Theatre.

Best Design: Joint Winners: Shona Reppe, Atlantis Banal: Beneath the Surface,  created with Vélo Théâtre, France, produced by Catherine Wheels, and Hyemi Shin (set and costume), Paul Jackson (lighting), Tov Belling and Katie Milwright (cinematography), Toby Angwin (visual effects); and Solaris, Royal Lyceum Theatre Edinburgh, Malthouse Theatre and the Lyric Hammersmith Theatre.

Best Music and Sound: Matthias Hermann (sound designer and composer), Thank You Very Much, Manchester International Festival and National Theatre of Scotland.

Best Technical Presentation: Solaris, Royal Lyceum Theatre Edinburgh, Malthouse Theatre and the Lyric Hammersmith Theatre.

Best Production for Children and Young People: Atlantis Banal: Beneath the Surface,  created with Vélo Théâtre, France, produced by Catherine Wheels.

References

External links
 

Scottish awards
Awards established in 2003
British theatre awards
2003 establishments in Scotland
Theatre in Scotland